Dhaubanjar (धौबन्जार) is a Newar surname of people originating from Bhaktapur, Nepal with Gargya (गार्ग्य) gotra. Derived from the Newari word for traders of yogurt, it was adopted by specific yogurt trader of Bhaktapur. It is said that the Malla king, Jagat Prakasha Malla, appointed traders to deliver yogurt in the palace. Dhaubanjar belong to the caste "Pāñcthariya" sub-group of Shrestha (श्रेष्ठ) caste and is of Vaishya varna. They are said to be inhabitants of Tibukche Tol, Bhaktapur originally. It was later adopted by some "Jyāpu", inhabitants of Itachen Tole, Bhaktapur, who were previously "Duwal".

Etymology 
The word "Dhaubanjar" is derived from the combination of two Newari words 'dhau'(धौ) and 'banja'(बन्जा). When Newari word is to be transliterated to Nepali, suffixes 'ra'(र) or 'la'(ल) is added. The composition can be understood as,धौ + बन्जा + र = धौबन्जार

Origin 
Dhaubanjar surname has its origin back from the end of mid-age, originated through occupational division of castes in Nepal.

References 

Newar
Surnames of Nepalese origin